Vincenzo De Luca (born 8 May 1949) is an Italian politician, member of the Democratic Party, currently serving as President of the Campania region since 18 June 2015. De Luca also served as Mayor of Salerno for more than 17 years, becoming one of the longest serving mayors in Italy.

De Luca has often been described as a populist politician and became known for his controversial statements. He is nicknamed Lo Sceriffo ("The Sheriff"), due to his outspokenly impetuous and strong government style, but also Don Vicienzo.

Early life
De Luca was born in 1949 in Ruvo del Monte, in the Province of Potenza. He then moved to Salerno at an early age alongside his family. 

After obtaining a high school diploma at the Liceo classico Torquato Tasso of Salerno, he graduated in philosophy at the University of Salerno. Before entering in politics, he work as a philosophy teacher in high schools.

In 1979, he married Rosa Zampetti, a sociologist, from who he had two sons Piero and Roberto, who are both involved in politics. Piero is serving as a member of the Chamber of Deputies, while Roberto served as a regional responsible for economy in the Democratic Party of Campania.

Political career
During the 1970s, De Luca became a member of the Italian Communist Party (PCI), at the time led by Enrico Berlinguer. In 1975, after having been head of the party's provincial organization, he was appointed as provincial secretary, leading the federation for a decade. In those years, he was jokingly nicknamed "O Professore" (Neapolitan for "The Professor") because of his job as a philosophy teacher. Due to his impetuous and strong style, De Luca was also nicknamed "Pol Pot", just like the Cambodian communist dictator.

Mayor of Salerno
De Luca was elected to the Salerno city council in 1990, holding the posts of both Commissioner of Public works and Deputy Mayor. In the spring of 1993, he was promoted to the office of mayor due to the resignation of Vincent Giordano, who found himself involved in the ongoing Tangentopoli investigation. A month later, the resignation of the majority of councilors resulted in the dissolution of the municipal council. The subsequent elections marked a significant success of De Luca's "Progressive List for Salerno", with 57.8% of votes in a second ballot against Giuseppe Acocella, of the centre-right coalition.

On 16 November 1997, De Luca was re-elected mayor in the first round with 71.3% of the vote.

Member of the Chamber of Deputies
Not being able to reapply for a third term as mayor, De Luca resigned in order to run for a parliamentary seat in the 2001 general election; on 31 May 2001 he was elected to the Chamber of Deputies with a percentage of 55.4% of the votes, the highest one obtained by a candidate of The Olive Tree coalition in Southern Italy.

After the 2006 general election, De Luca was re-elected at the Chamber of Deputies and was appointed as a member of the Agriculture Commission.

Mayor of Salerno again

During the 2006 local elections, De Luca was re-elected as Mayor of Salerno for a third term after a run-off election, gaining 56.9% of the ballots. He ran as the candidate of the center-left list "Progressives for Salerno", in opposition to the MEP Alfonso Andria, supported by The Daisy, and some members of the Democrats of the Left, which were against De Luca's candidacy, due to his strong dissent towards Democrat President of Campania Antonio Bassolino.

In the general election of April 2008 he was unable to run also due to the incompatibility provided by law between the offices of member of the parliament and mayor of a city with more than 15,000 inhabitants. While in office, De Luca was one of the most popular mayor in Italy.

On 30 January 2010 De Luca announced his candidacy to become President of Campania in the March regional election. However, his centre-right rival Stefano Caldoro, a former minister and leader of the New PSI (merged into The People of Freedom in 2009) won by a convincing margin, thanks to a 20% swing in favor of the centre-right, which included the Union of the Centre led by Ciriaco De Mita, an influential former leader of Christian Democracy.

In 2011, De Luca was re-elected for a fourth term as Mayor of Salerno with 74.42% of votes.

President of Campania
On 31 May 2015, De Luca was elected President of Campania in the regional election, with  41% of the votes, defeating incumbent president Stefano Caldoro with a margin of 66,000 votes. He has been then reconfirmed in his position at the 2020 regional elections, which he won with 68% of the votes.

COVID-19
De Luca is well known for making hyperbolic statements, a behavior that was brought to national attention during the COVID-19 pandemic in Italy. On 20 March 2020, he threatened to send Carabinieri "with flamethrowers" after those organizing graduation parties. On 16 October, in explaining the decision to impose a curfew, he urged Campanians not to  celebrate Halloween, calling it a "huge stupid Americanism". His statements, made in jest but with a serious tone and purpose, have been described by Corriere della Sera as "comic" and "uncouth".

Italian software house DigiLabSoftware notably satirized on the president's statements with some HTML browser games freely playable on their website, which attracted some press attention.

Controversies
In November 2021, De Luca was investigated for corruption regarding a scandal involving the maintenance of city streets, public greenery and parks of Salerno. As reported by Corriere della Sera, the public prosecutor denounced the presence of a so-called "cartel", composed of eight cooperatives, which rigged the public procurements' tenders.

References

1949 births
Living people
Presidents of Campania
People from the Province of Potenza
Mayors of Salerno
People from Salerno